was a Japanese composer and professor of music. He was the father of pianist, composer and musicologist Takejiro Hirai and cellist Jyoichiro Hirai.

Works, editions and recordings
 Idyl for clarinet 1941
 Song Nara-yama (平城山, Nara mountain), recorded by Jean-Pierre Rampal (flute) and Ensemble Lunaire. Japanese Folk Melodies transcribed by Akio Yashiro. CBS Records, 1978.
 Song Yuri-kago (ゆりかご, the rocking cradle)

References

1910 births
2002 deaths
20th-century Japanese composers
20th-century Japanese male musicians
Japanese male composers
Musicians from Kōchi Prefecture
People from Kōchi Prefecture